August William Kjellstrand (February 10, 1864 – October 29, 1930)  was an American football coach.

Coaching career
Kjellstrand was the first head football coach at Bethany College in Lindsborg, Kansas.  He held that position for the 1893 and 1894 seasons.  His coaching record at Bethany was 2–2.

Academics
While at Bethany, he also worked as the professor of Latin and served as a pastor.  He later was at Augustana College in Rock Island, Illinois where he was secretary of the college and later principal of the academy.  He also completed several translations of academic works.

References

External links
 
	

1864 births
1930 deaths
Bethany Swedes football coaches
People from Skövde Municipality